Jaber is an Arabic name for males used as a given name and surname.  Alternative spellings are Gaber and Jabir.

People with the given name
Jaber Abu Hussein (c. 1913–1992), Arabic poet
Jaber Al-Ameri (born 1986), Saudi Arabian footballer
Jaber Al-Owaisi (born 1989), Omani footballer 
Jaber Al-Ahmad Al-Jaber Al-Sabah (1926-2006), 13th ruler of Kuwait
Jaber Al-Ahmad International Stadium
Sheikh Jaber Al Ahmad Cultural Centre
Sheikh Jaber al-Ahmad al-Sabah Causeway
Jaber I Al-Sabah (1770–1859), third ruler of Kuwait
Jaber II Al-Sabah (1860–1917), eighth ruler of Kuwait
Jaber Al-Mubarak Al-Hamad Al-Sabah (born 1942), Prime Minister of Kuwait
Jaber Al Mutairi (born 1990), Kuwaiti footballer
Jaber Alwan (born 1948), Italian artist 
Jaber Ansari (born 1987), Iranian football player 
Jaber Behrouzi (born 1991), Iranian weightlifter 
Jaber Ebdali (born c. 1975), Iranian businessman and white-collar criminal
Jaber A. Elbaneh (born 1966), or Gabr al-Bana, Yemeni-American terrorist 
Jaber F. Gubrium (born 1943) is an American sociologist
Jaber Hagawi (born 1981), Saudi Arabian footballer
Jaber Mustafa (born 1997), Saudi Arabian footballer
Jaber Rouzbahani (born 1986), Iranian basketball player 
Jaber Saeed Salem, born Yani Marchokov (born 1975), Qatari weightlifter

People with the surname
Abdul Malik Jaber, Palestinian businessman
Abdullah Jaber (born 1993), Palestinian footballer
Ahmed Abdu Jaber (born 1996), Eritrean footballer 
Ahmad Ali Jaber (born 1982), Iraqi football goalkeeper
Ahmed Jumah Jaber (born 1983), Qatari long-distance runner
Ali Jaber (born 1961), Lebanese journalist, media consultant and TV personality
Ali Hassan al-Jaber (1955–2011), camera operator killed in the Libyan Civil War
Assem Jaber (born 1946), Lebanese diplomat
Fahad Abo Jaber (born 1985), Saudi footballer 
Fatima Al Jaber (born 1965), COO of Al Jaber Group
Haji Jaber (born 1976), Eritrean novelist
Hala Jaber, Lebanese-British journalist
Hessa Al Jaber, Qatari engineer, academic and politician
Hisham Jaber (born 1942), Lebanese major general 
Inaya Jaber (1958–2021), Lebanese writer, artist and singer
Kaltham Jaber (born 1958), Qatari writer and poet
Khalid Al-Jaber, Qatari academic
Mohamed Bin Issa Al Jaber (born 1959), Saudi Arabian-born Austrian-British billionaire and philanthropist
Mohammed Jaber (footballer) (born 1989), Emirati footballer
Naji Jaber (1940–2009), Syrian actor 
Rabee Jaber (born 1972), Lebanese author, novelist and journalist 
Rabih Jaber (born 1987), Swedish singer of Lebanese descent
Salih Jaber (born 1985), Iraqi football player
Sultan Ahmed Al Jaber, Emirati politician and businessman
Tamara Jaber (born 1982), Lebanese - Australian pop singer-songwriter 
Tawfik Jaber (died 2008), chief of police in Gaza, killed in the 2008–2009 Israel–Gaza conflict
Tiana Jaber (born 2000), Australian football player
Yassine Jaber, Lebanese politician
Sami Al-Jaber (born 1972), Saudi Arabian footballer
Zaid Jaber (born 1991), Jordanian footballer
Zara Nutley (Zahrah Mary Chassib Jaber, 1924–2016), British television actress

Arabic masculine given names
Arabic-language surnames